Anisoperas is a genus of moths in the Geometridae family.

Ennominae
Geometridae genera